Thomas Firth Lockwood was the name of two architects in the U.S. state of Georgia, the father and son commonly known as T. Firth Lockwood Sr. (1868-1920) and T. Firth Lockwood Jr. (1894-1963).  Thomas Firth Lockwood Sr. came with his brother Frank Lockwood (1865-1935) to Columbus, Georgia, from New Jersey to practice architecture.

A number of their works are listed on the National Register of Historic Places for their architecture.

Works include (with attribution which is sometimes ambiguous):
First Presbyterian Church (rebuilding after an 1891 fire) Columbus, Georgia
Clinch County Jail (1893), Court Sq., Homerville, Georgia (Lockwood, Thomas F.), NRHP-listed
Columbian Lodge No. 7 Free and Accepted Masons (1902), 101 12th St., Columbus, Georgia, later known as Flowers Building, (T. Firth Lockwood), NRHP-listed 
First Baptist Church (1906), in Tifton Residential Historic District, Tifton, Georgia (Lockwood, T.F.), Romanesque Revival-style church, with an arcaded entrance, round-arched stained-glass windows, and two square corner towers. (The NRHP listing document for the district asserts it was designed by T. Firth Lockwood, Jr., but he would have been only about 12 years old, so more likely it was designed by T. Firth Lockwood, Sr., age 38 or so then.)
James Price McRee House (1907), 181 E. Broad St., Camilla, Georgia (Lockwood, T. Firth), NRHP-listed
Masonic Lodge (Cordele, Georgia) (1907), in Cordele Commercial Historic District, Cordele, Georgia (T. Firth Lockwood, Sr.), NRHP-listed
Arlington Methodist Episcopal Church, South (1908), Pioneer Rd. at Dogwood Dr. Arlington, Georgia (Lockwood, T. Firth, Sr.), NRHP-listed
Carnegie Library of Moultrie (1908), 39 North Main Street, Moultrie, Georgia, with Georgian Revival elements.
Webster County Courthouse (1915), Courthouse Sq., Preston, GA (Lockwood, T.F), NRHP-listed
Quitman County Courthouse (1939), Main St., Georgetown, Georgiam in Stripped Classical style. (T. Firth Lockwood Jr.), NRHP-listed
St. Luke Methodist Church, Columbus, Georgia
Dorminy-Massee House, 516 W. Central Ave., Fitzgerald, Georgia (Lockwood, T. Firth Sr.), NRHP-listed
Hiram Warner Hill House, LaGrange St., Greenville, Georgia (Lockwood, Thomas Firth), NRHP-listed
Methodist Tabernacle, 1605 3rd Ave., Columbus, Georgia (Lockwood, Thomas Firth), NRHP-listed
Old Dawson Place, 1420 Wynnton Rd., Columbus, Georgia (Lockwood, T. Firth, Sr.), NRHP-listed
Render Family Homestead, GA 18, Greenville, Georgia (Lockwood, T. Firth, Sr.), NRHP-listed
C.B. Tarver Building, 18-23 W. 11th St., Columbus, Georgia (Lockwood, T. Firth), NRHP-listed
One or more works in Everett Square Historic District, roughly bounded by Knoxville, Vineville, Anderson, and Macon Sts. and the Central of Georgia RR tracks, Fort Valley, Georgia (Lockwood, T. Firth), NRHP-listed
One or more works in O'Neal School Neighborhood Historic District, Roughly bounded by the Seaboard Coastline Railroad, Owens St. 16th Ave. and 6th St., Cordele, Georgia (Lockwood, T. Firth), NRHP-listed

See also
Columbus High School, 320 11th St. Columbus, Georgia (Lockwood Bros.), NRHP-listed 
Jasper County Courthouse, Courthouse Sq. Monticello, Georgia (Lockwood Bros.), NRHP-listed
MacIntyre Park and MacIntyre Park High School, 117 Glenwood Dr. Thomasville, Georgia (Lockwood & Poundstone), NRHP-listed

References

Architects from Georgia (U.S. state)
19th-century American architects
20th-century American architects